Abū Muḥammad al-Ḥasan ibn Aḥmad ibn Yaʿqūb al-Hamdānī (279/280-333/334 A.H.;  947;) was an Arab Muslim geographer, chemist, poet, grammarian, historian, and astronomer, from the tribe of Banu Hamdan, western 'Amran, Yemen. He was one of the best representatives of Islamic culture during the last period of the Abbasid Caliphate. His work was the subject of extensive 19th-century Austrian scholarship.

Biography
The biographical details of al-Hamdani's life are scant, despite his extensive scientific work. He was held in high repute as a grammarian, wrote much poetry, compiled astronomical tables and is said to have devoted most of his life to the study of the ancient history and geography of Arabia.

Before he was born his family had lived in al-Marashi (المراشي). Then they moved to Sana'a (صنعاء), where al-Hamdani was born in the year 893.  His father had been a traveller and had visited Kufa, Baghdad, Basra, Oman and Egypt. At around the age of seven, al-Marashi started to talk about his desire to travel. Somewhat later he left for Mecca, where he remained and studied for more than six years, after which he departed for Sa'dah (صعدة). There he gathered information on Khawlaan (خولان). Later, he went back to Sanaa and became interested in the land that was Himyar (حمْير), but was imprisoned for two years due to his political views. After his release from prison, he went to Raydah (ريدة) to live under the protection of his own tribe. He compiled most of his books while there and stayed on until his death in 945.

Writings
His Geography of the Arabian Peninsula (Sifat Jazirat ul-Arab) is by far the most important work on the subject, where he describes the geography and the linguistic situation in the Arabian peninsula and Socotra. The manuscript was used by Austrian orientalist, Aloys Sprenger in his Post- und Reiserouten des Orients (Leipzig, 1864) and further in his Alte Geographie Arabiens (Bern, 1875), and was edited by D.H. Müller (Leiden, 1884; cf. Sprenger's criticism in Zeitschrift der deutschen morgenländischen Gesellschaft, vol. 45, pp. 361–394).

His work has been the subject of extensive research and publications by the Austrian Arabist, Eduard Glaser, a specialist on ancient Arabia. The other great work of al-Hamdānī is his ten volume, Iklil (the Diadem), concerning the genealogies of the Himyarites and the wars waged by their kings. Volume 8, on the citadels and castles of southern Arabia, has been translated into German, edited and annotated by David Heinrich Müller as Die Burgen und Schlösser Sudarabiens (Vienna, 1881).

Other works said to have been written by al-Hamdani are listed in G. L. Flügel's Die grammatischen Schulen der Araber (Leipzig, 1862), pp. 220–221.

List of works
 Kitab al-Jawharatayn al-ʻatīqatayn - A book describing metals known at that time, including their physical and chemical properties as well as treatment and processing (such as gold, silver, and steel). He is also considered one of the earliest Arabs who explained gravity of Earth in a way similar to magnetic field behavior.
Sifat Jazirat ul-Arab, Geography/Character of the Arabian Peninsula.
Kitāb al-Iklīl min akhbār al-Yaman wa-ansāb Ḥimyar; Crowns from the Accounts of al-Yemen and the genealogies of Ḥimyar. al-Iklīl consists of ten volumes. However, only four volumes have been found (Vol.1, Vol.2, Vol.8 and Vol.10); the other volumes are missing.
History of Sabaʾ.
Language of Himyar and Najran.

Notes and references

Bibliography
 
 
 Britannica
 Nabih Amin Faris: The Antiquities of South Arabia being a Translation from the Arabic with Linguistic, Geographic and Historic Notes of the Eight Book of al-Hamdānī's al-Iklīl, Princeton, 1938
 Yūsuf Muḥammad ʿAbd Allāh (Hrsg.): Al-Hamdani. A great Yemeni Scholar. Studies on the Occasion of his Millenial Anniversary. Sanaa, 1986
 Yūsuf Muḥammad ʿAbd Allāh: al-Ḥasan b. Aḥmad al-Hamdānī, In: Al-Mausūʿa al-Yamanīya, Sanaa, 2003, vol. 4, S. 3097ff.
 Yūsuf Muḥammad ʿAbd Allāh: Die Personennamen in al-Hamdānī's al-Iklīl und ihre Parallel in den altsüdarabischen Inschriften, Dissertation, Universität Tübingen, 1975.
 Jörn Heise: Die Gründung Sana'as – Ein orientalisch-islamischer Mythos? Berlin, Klaus Schwarz Verlag, May 2010,  (the fifth chapter is devoted to al-Hamdani's Biography )
 O. Löfgren: Art. "al-Hamdānī" in The Encyclopaedia of Islam. New Edition vol. III, S. 124a-125a.

External links
 

890s births
945 deaths
Year of birth uncertain
10th-century Arabs
10th-century astronomers
10th-century geographers
10th-century historians from the Abbasid Caliphate
Arab grammarians
Medieval grammarians of Arabic
Astronomers of the medieval Islamic world
Yemeni astronomers
Geographers of the medieval Islamic world
Yemeni geographers
People from Sanaa
Yemeni Muslims
Yemeni historians
Yemeni people who died in prison custody
Yemeni writers
Banu Hamdan
10th-century Yemeni historians
10th-century Yemeni writers
10th-century Yemeni poets
Yemeni genealogists